Rodolfo Valentino Padilla Fernandez (March 3, 1952 – June 7, 2008), better known as Rudy Fernandez or Daboy, was a Filipino actor and producer. He came to prominence as an action star in Philippine cinema during the 1980s up to the early 1990s.

Early life and career
Fernandez was born at 8:36 PM on March 3, 1952, at Mary Johnston Hospital in Tondo, Manila. He is the eldest son of the late film director Gregorio Fernandez and actress Pilar Padilla (daughter of José Padilla Sr.). Both his parents were from Lubao, Pampanga, which he considered his hometown. He made his film debut at the age of three, appearing in Luksang Tagumpay (1956), which was directed by his father. He also appeared in another film of his father's, Emily (1960).

Fernandez started his active film career while a student at the University of Santo Tomas, when he was signed to a contract by Sampaguita Pictures in 1970. He was first featured by Sampaguita Pictures in For Your Mama (1970), then paired with Connie Angeles in Sweet Matutina (1970). Fernandez spent the next few years in teenage parts until he made his breakthrough as an action star with Bitayin si... Baby Ama? (1976). His viability as an action star was further enhanced with the box-office success of Ang Leon, ang Tigre at ang Alamid (1979).

Beginning with Baby Ama, a biopic of a well-known Filipino criminal, Fernandez specialized in portraying true-to-life characters. One of his notable action films is Markang Bungo (Skull Mark), a film based on a true story, where he portrayed the well-known Baguio police officer Bobby Ortega, was released in 1992. From this film came a signature line of Fernandez's, "Walang personalan, trabaho lang" ("Strictly business, nothing personal"), which has since been cited as among the most memorable quotes in Philippine cinema by QTV's Ang Pinaka television program. Iligpit si Bobby Ortega: Markang Bungo 2 (Execute Bobby Ortega, Skull Mark 2) is a sequel that was released in 1995. Aside for portraying a real police officer, he was cast in the lead roles for the biopics of Filipino politicians Alfredo Lim, Vincent Crisologo, and Ping Lacson. In the film Lagalag: The Eddie Fernandez Story, he starred as Eddie Fernandez, a Filipino actor during the 1970s and the father of Pops Fernandez.

With the decline of production of Filipino action films during the 2000s, Fernandez turned to television roles. In the short-lived GMA Network sitcom Da Boy, en Da Girl, he starred opposite Rosanna Roces. He also played as a supporting role in other TV series in GMA like Twin Hearts and Atlantika. He was also the host of the docu-drama Kasangga.

Awards
Fernandez has won two FAMAS Best Actor awards for the action films Batuigas... Pasukuin si Waway (Batuigas... Make Waway Surrender) (1984) and Operation: Get Victor Corpus, The Rebel Soldier (1988). In addition to these wins, FAMAS has also nominated Rudy Fernandez an additional 13 times from 1976 to 1998. He also won two FAP Best Actor awards for Batuigas... and for Birador (1998).

In 2007, FAMAS awarded him the Fernando Poe, Jr. Memorial Award. The next year, the Philippine Movie Press Club (PMPC) bestowed the 2008 Ulirang Artista Lifetime Achievement Award to Rudy Fernandez, at the 24th PMPC Star Awards for Movies. He was also the recipient of the Film Academy of the Philippines FPJ Lifetime Achievement Award.

Personal life
Fernandez hometown is Lubao, Pampanga. He came from famous Padilla showbiz clan in his maternal side. Robin, BB Gandanghari, and Rommel Padilla are his cousins and Zsa Zsa Padilla is a niece. He has one son, Mark Anthony Fernandez, with former partner Alma Moreno and two sons, Raphael Fernandez and Renz Fernandez with Lorna Tolentino, his wife. His grandson Grae (son of Mark Anthony Fernandez) also joined the showbiz industry.

He was survived by his wife, sons, and cousins; consequently, as he is the Padilla brothers' cousin, his grandson, Grae Fernandez, is the nephew of teen king Daniel Padilla.

Politics
During the 2001 elections, Fernandez ran for mayor of Quezon City under the banner of the Puwersa ng Masa. Although he garnered most of the votes in District 2 where the voters were composed mostly of indigent citizens, he lost in the remaining three districts and was defeated by then-House Speaker Sonny Belmonte of the People Power Coalition.

Illness and death
In 2007, it was revealed by Lorna Tolentino on Startalk that her husband had been diagnosed with periampullary cancer. Fernandez underwent treatment in Tokyo, Japan. After a healing Mass on May 10, 2008, by several friends at the Christ the King Church, Quezon City, he was rushed to a San Juan hospital for back pains. The Sun Star reported that Fernandez was actually suffering from pancreatic cancer, instead.

Fernandez celebrated his 25th wedding anniversary with Lorna Tolentino on June 1, 2008. He suffered a seizure three days later on June 4, but refused to be taken back to the Cardinal Santos Memorial Center in San Juan.

Fernandez died from periampullary cancer at his home in Quezon City on the morning of June 7, 2008.
 His remains were brought to The Heritage Park in Taguig City, and his interment took place on June 12, 2008, at 3 p.m. for his burial.

Filmography

Movies

Television

References

External links

1952 births
2008 deaths
20th-century comedians
20th-century Filipino male actors
21st-century Filipino male actors
Burials at The Heritage Park
Deaths from cancer in the Philippines
Deaths from pancreatic cancer
Rudy
Filipino actor-politicians
Filipino male child actors
Filipino male comedians
Filipino male film actors
Filipino male television actors
Filipino people of Chinese descent
Filipino people of Spanish descent
Filipino Roman Catholics
Filipino television personalities
Kapampangan people
Male actors from Manila
Padilla family
People from Tondo, Manila
People from Pampanga
University of Santo Tomas alumni
GMA Network personalities